The 2016 TCR Benelux Touring Car Championship is the first season of the TCR Benelux Touring Car Championship. The season started on 21 May at Spa-Francorchamps and ended on 30 October at Mettet.

Teams and drivers
Michelin is the official tyre supplier.

Notes

Calendar and results
The 2016 schedule consists in six rounds in the Benelux region, across Belgium, Netherlands and Luxembourg. Each round includes five races: a 60-minute-long qualifying race with a mandatory driver change, and four 20-minute-long sprint races. The starting grid for the qualifying race is established by a popular vote via Facebook, through the Making the Grid application. Race 1 uses the fastest lap of after the pit stop during the qualifying race to determine the starting grid. Race 3 uses the fastest lap of before the pit stop during qualifying race. Races 2 and 4 include a rolling start using the finishing order, respectively, of Race 1 and 3. The order for the qualifying race was subsequently revised with an aggregate score from the fan voting and the fastest laps from the final 15 minutes from the 45-minute Free Practice session (Fast lap window) held before the qualifying race. In case of a tie in the aggregate score, the results from the fan voting will have bigger weight. The calendar was announced on 17 November 2015.

Championship standings

Scoring systems

Qualifying race

Sprint races

In every classification, points from the worst round are dropped.

Drivers' championships
In sprint races both the competing driver and the co-driver that is not competing score points.

Notes
 ‡ – Half points were awarded in Race 4 at Spa-Francorchamps as less than 75% of the scheduled distance was completed due to heavy rain.

Junior class
In contrast to the overall Drivers' championship only the driver competing scores points in sprint races.

Notes
 ‡ – Half points were awarded in Race 4 at Spa-Francorchamps as less than 75% of the scheduled distance was completed due to heavy rain.

Teams' championship
Points toward the Teams' championship are only awarded in the qualifying race.

Cars' championship
Points toward the Cars' championship are only awarded in the sprint races.

Notes
 ‡ – Half points were awarded in Race 4 at Spa-Francorchamps as less than 75% of the scheduled distance was completed due to heavy rain.

References

External links
 

BeNeLux Touring Car Championship
2016 in European sport